Awo  may refer to: 

Awo, Nigeria
Babalawo
Iyalawo

See also
AWO (disambiguation)